Halldór Sigurbjörnsson (3 October 1933 – 29 April 1983) was an Icelandic footballer. He played in eight matches for the Iceland national football team from 1954 to 1957.

References

External links
 

1933 births
1983 deaths
Halldor Sigurbjornsson
Halldor Sigurbjornsson
Place of birth missing
Association footballers not categorized by position